Santa Rosa  is a corregimiento in Capira District, Panamá Oeste Province, Panama with a population of 1,767 as of 2010. It was created by Law 5 of January 19, 1998. Its population as of 2000 was 1,597.

References

Corregimientos of Panamá Oeste Province